James Edward Gunn (born October 21, 1938) is the Eugene Higgins Professor of Astronomy at Princeton University. Gunn's early theoretical work in astronomy has helped establish the current understanding of how galaxies form, and the properties of the space between galaxies. He also suggested important observational tests to confirm the presence of dark matter in galaxies, and predicted the existence of a Gunn–Peterson trough in the spectra of distant quasars.

Much of Gunn's later work has involved leadership in major observational projects. He developed plans for one of the first uses of digital camera technology for space observation, a project that led to the Sloan Digital Sky Survey, the most extensive three-dimensional mapping of the universe ever undertaken.  He also played a major role with the Wide Field and Planetary Camera on the Hubble Space Telescope.

Gunn graduated from A.C. Jones High School in Beeville, Texas in 1957. He earned his bachelor's degree at Rice University in Houston, Texas, in 1961, and his Ph.D. from the California Institute of Technology (Caltech) in 1965. He joined the faculty of Princeton University two years later. Subsequently, he worked at the University of California at Berkeley and Caltech before returning to Princeton. He is married to the astronomer Gillian Knapp and they have two children, Humberto and Marleny Gunn.

Honors
 1977 – Elected member of the American Academy of Arts and Sciences
 1977 – Elected member of the National Academy of Sciences 
1983 – MacArthur Fellow
 1987 – Distinguished Alumnus Award, Rice University
 1987 – Elected member of the American Philosophical Society
 1988 – Heineman Prize
 1994 – Gold Medal of the Royal Astronomical Society
 2001 – Petrie Prize, Canadian Astronomical Society
 2002 – Joseph Weber Award for Astronomical Instrumentation
 2002 – Distinguished Alumnus Award, California Institute of Technology
 2005 – Crafoord Prize with James Peebles and Martin Rees
 2005 – Henry Norris Russell Lectureship of the American Astronomical Society
 2005 – Gruber Cosmology Prize
 2006 – Honorary Degree from the University of Portsmouth
 2008 – National Medal of Science
 2013 – Bruce Medal of the Astronomical Society of the Pacific
 2019 – Kyoto Prize in Basic Sciences (Earth and Planetary Sciences, Astronomy and Astrophysics)

References

Further reading
 Ann K. Finkbeiner. A Grand and Bold Thing: An Extraordinary New Map of the Universe Ushering In A New Era of Discovery (2010), on the Sloan Digital Sky Survey
 Preston, Richard. First Light. New York: Atlantic Monthly Press.	;   OCLC 16004290

Members of the United States National Academy of Sciences
1938 births
Living people
American astronomers
Princeton University faculty
Rice University alumni
California Institute of Technology alumni
University of California, Berkeley faculty
Recipients of the Gold Medal of the Royal Astronomical Society
Winners of the Dannie Heineman Prize for Astrophysics
People from Livingston, Texas
MacArthur Fellows
Members of the American Philosophical Society
Kyoto laureates in Basic Sciences